Agustín Díaz (born June 6, 1954), known as Augie Diaz, is an American sailor and world-class competitor in the Snipe, Star and Laser classes.

He is the son of Gonzalo Diaz, who sailed for Cuba at the 1959 Pan American Games.

He began sailing Optimists at the age of eight in Clearwater, Florida. In 1973, he won the IYRU Single-handed dinghy World Youth title in the Laser class.  After graduating from Christopher Columbus High School (Miami) in 1972, Diaz sailed for Tulane University, where he studied Mechanical engineering. He was All American on the Tulane Green Wave sailing team in 1973, 1974 and 1975, won the ICSA Coed Dinghy National Championship in 1973 and the ICSA Men's Singlehanded National Championship in 1974, leading the team to win the Leonard M. Fowle Trophy in 1974. That same year he was elected ICSA College Sailor of the Year.

He received the US Sailor of the Year Award in 2003, and was inducted in the National Sailing Hall of Fame in 2021.

He has been Snipe world champion in 2003 and 2005, and Star world champion in 2016.

In the Snipe class, he was also world masters champion in 2002, 2004, 2006 y 2012; Western Hemisphere & Orient champion in 1972, 2002 and 2021; North American champion in 1974, 2004, 2006, 2007, 2008 and 2013; and U.S. National champion in 1974, 1980, 2001, 2002, 2006, 2008, 2009, 2010, 2011 and 2018.

He has won a silver medal in Snipe at the 1971 Pan American Games and a silver medal in the Snipe at the 2011 Pan American Games and a bronze medal at the 2015 Pan American Games.

Pan American Games
 Silver medal in Snipe at Colombia 1971.
 Silver medal in Snipe at Guadalajara 2011.
 Bronze medal in Snipe at Toronto 2015.

References

External links
 
 

1954 births
Living people
American male sailors (sport)
Pan American Games bronze medalists for the United States
Sailors at the 2011 Pan American Games
Sailors at the 2015 Pan American Games
Snipe class world champions
Star class world champions
Tulane University alumni
Tulane Green Wave sailors
ICSA College Sailor of the Year
US Sailor of the Year
Cuban emigrants to the United States
Pan American Games silver medalists for the United States
Pan American Games medalists in sailing
World champions in sailing for the United States
Medalists at the 2011 Pan American Games
Medalists at the 2015 Pan American Games
Christopher Columbus High School (Miami-Dade County, Florida) alumni